The Borden Classic was a golf tournament on the LPGA Tour from 1965 to 1978. It was played at several courses in the Columbus, Ohio area.

Tournament locations

Winners
Borden Classic
1978 JoAnne Carner
1977 JoAnne Carner
1976 Judy Rankin
1975 Carol Mann

LPGA Borden Classic
1974 Sharon Miller

Pabst Ladies Classic
1973 Judy Rankin
1972 Marilynn Smith

Len Immke Buick Open
1971 Sandra Haynie
1970 Mary Mills

Pabst Ladies Classic
1969 Susie Berning
1968 Carol Mann

Lady Carling Open
1967 Kathy Whitworth
1966 Clifford Ann Creed

Lady Carling Midwest Open
1965 Kathy Whitworth

References

Former LPGA Tour events
Golf in Ohio
Sports competitions in Columbus, Ohio
Sports in Dublin, Ohio
History of women in Ohio
Recurring sporting events established in 1965
Recurring sporting events disestablished in 1978
1965 establishments in Ohio
1978 disestablishments in Ohio